The following is a list of notable people who were born or lived in Palmerston North, New Zealand, and people who spent significant periods of their lives living in the Manawatu region.

See :Category:People from Palmerston North

Famous Business People

 Kate Ross, Founder & CEO of Kinetic Recruitment
 Lloyd Morrison, founder & CEO of Infratil Limited
 Morton Coutts, brewer, developed continuous fermentation method.
 Joseph Nathan, founder of Glaxo
 Leopold Henry Collinson, founder of Collinson and Cunninghame´s

Creative artists

 Joy Cowley, children's author
 Brian Boyd, World expert on Nabokov
 Paul Dibble, sculptor
 Andrew Drummond, sculptor
 Janet Frame, author
 Pat Hanly, artist
 Judy Bailey, former newsreader, deemed "Mother of the Nation"
 Olaf Wiig, photojournalist
 Saffronn Te Ratana, artist
 Leonard Mitchell, artist
 Sarah Ann McMurray, woodcarver

Politicians and leaders

Members of Parliament for Palmerston North, Manawatu and Rangitikei
 Trevor de Cleene, Labour MP (1981–90).
 Iain Lees-Galloway, Labour MP for Palmerston North (2008-2020)
 Steve Maharey, Labour MP for Palmerston North (1990-2008) and now retired from Parliament. Former Vice-Chancellor of Massey University (2008-2016).
 Jimmy Nash, former Mayor and MP for Palmerston (North).
 Simon Power, National MP; grew up in Palmerston North, former MP for Rangitikei (1999-2011). Now retired from Parliament.
 William Blair Tennent, former Mayor and National MP, represented Palmerston North (1949–54).
 Joe Walding, Labour MP (1967–75; 1978–81)
 Jill White, Labour MP for Manawatu; elected Mayor of Palmerston North (1998-2001); former councillor on Horizons Regional Council.

other MPs: other electorates and List
 Ashraf Choudhary, Labour list MP; now retired.
 Jacqui Dean, National MP; grew up in Palmerston North. Current MP for Waitaki.
 Lynne Pillay, Labour MP; now retired from Parliament.
 Grant Robertson, Labour MP; born in Palmerston North. Current MP for Wellington Central and Current Deputy Prime Minister.
 Metiria Turei, Green MP and former co-leader of the party.
David Seymour, ACT MP; Current Party Leader and Current MP for Epsom.

Mayors
 Jono Naylor, major (2007–14).
 Heather Tanguay, mayor (2004–07).
 Mark Bell-Booth, mayor (2001–04).
 Jill White, mayor (1998-2001).
 Paul Rieger mayor (1985–98).
 Brian Elwood mayor (1971–85)
 George Snelson, (1877–1879, 1883–1884, 1889–1892, 1901), first mayor. Snelson is regarded as the founding father of Palmerston North.

Other
 Zillah Gill, local body politician
 Scott Ludlam, Australian Greens WA Federal Senator (2008-2017)
 Hedwig (Hettie) Ross (née Weitzel), a founding member of the Communist Party of New Zealand

Actors, performers, models, broadcasters, television presenters/hosts 
 David Geary, screenwriter and actor
 John Clarke, satirist famous as character "Fred Dagg"
 Shane Cortese, actor
 Jeremy Corbett, comic
 Hamish McKay (TV3 Sports Presenter)
 Simon Ferry, actor
 Nick Gibb, comic
 Rachel Crofts (Miss Manawatu - 2006 & Miss Earth NZ - 2008)
 Claire Kirby (Miss Manawatu - 2007 & Miss Earth NZ - 2007)
 Alison Quigan (Actor, Director and Playwright)
 Spankie Jackzon (drag performer and artist)
 Laura Daniel (actor, comic)
 Matthew Sunderland (Actor)

Musical artists

 Alan Gregg, (bass player), The Mutton Birds
 Nigel Keay, (composer)
 Anna Leese, operatic soprano
 Alan Loveday, violinist
 PNC, rapper
 Rosina Buckman, operatic soprano
 Gary Brain, conductor
 Stuart Easton, piper
 Michael Houstoun, concert pianist
 Benny Tipene, singer-songwriter and musician

Sportspeople
 Matthew Conger, FIFA International football Referee
 Craig Clare, former Manawatu Turbos rugby player
 Christian Cullen, former All Black rugby player
 Mark Donaldson, Former All Black rugby player
 Jason Eaton, former All Black rugby player; later moved to Taranaki
 Jason Emery, Manawatu Turbo and Highlander; now plays in Japan
 Kris Gemmell, International triathlete
 Brendon Hartley, former F1 driver for Toro Rosso
Ngani Laumape, All Black, Hurricane, Turbo, former NZ Warrior.
 Jake Gleeson, Footballer playing for Portland Timbers in Major League Soccer
 David Kirk - former All Black, captain of the winning team at the 1987 Rugby World Cup. Later became CEO of Fairfax Australia.
 Michael Mason -  former New Zealand Black Cap and Central Districts bowler
 Nehe Milner-Skudder - All Black, Hurricane and Turbo
 Charles John Monro -  founder of rugby union in New Zealand, lived for a time in an area now part of Palmerston North
 Emily Naylor - current New Zealand Black Sticks player.
 Steven Old -  former New Zealand All White (soccer)
 Jacob Oram - former cricket player
 Farah Palmer - former New Zealand Black Fern
 Craig Perks -  International golfer
 Reece Robinson -  former Manawatu Turbo
 Moira Senior - former New Zealand Black Sticks Hockey player.
 Kayla Whitelock - New Zealand Black Sticks Hockey Women's.
 Levi Sherwood
 Craig Spearman -  former Black Cap, cricket player
 James Tamou -  current Australian Kangaroo, has previously represented New Zealand Maori, switched allegiance to New South Wales and became eligible to play for Australia)
 Ross Taylor - current New Zealand Black Caps captain and Central Districts batsman (cricket)
 Dion Waller -  former rugby player.
 Tim Wilkinson - professional golfer
 Selica Winiata - Black Fern, NZ Women's Sevens and Manawatu Cyclone (Current)
 Sam Whitelock - All Black (current)
 Joe Schmidt -  former head coach of Leinster Rugby, current head coach of Ireland national rugby union team. 
 Adam Whitelock - Crusader
 George Whitelock - Crusader
 Aaron Cruden -  All Black, plays Super Rugby for the Chiefs.
 Grant Webb
 Jamie How - former cricket player
 Bevan Griggs
 George Worker - Blackcap, Central Districts Stag (current).
 Aaron Smith - All Black (current) 
 Tomasi Cama - Manawatu Rugby representative and New Zealand All Blacks Sevens star.
 Adam Milne - current Black Cap cricketer
 Ricky Thorby - Rugby League player, currently without an NRL club.
 Jade Te Rure - Rugby union player, currently playing for Yorkshire Carnegie.
 Jono Lester - Professional racing driver in Super GT (Japan).
 Jamie Booth, Hurricane, Turbo, former Sunwolves halfback.

Activists, philanthropists
 Fred Hollows, ophthalmologist

Academics and scientists
 Guy Dodson (1937–2012), biochemist who specialised in protein crystallography
 John Dunmore (1923- ), historian, founder of Modern Languages Dept, Massey University

Others
 Rayed Mohammed Abdullah Ali, briefly resident in the city in 2006 on a student visa until deported because he "posed a threat to national security", having been an associate of Hani Hanjour, one of the hijacking pilots in the September 11, 2001 attacks

 Madge Allsop (fictional). Played by Emily Perry and others, she starred as the sidekick of Dame Edna Everidge (played by Barry Humphries) for 14 episodes of the Dame Edna Experience (1987-1989). In reference to Madge's drab appearance and demeanor, Humphries would often deride her by simply telling the audience "she's from Palmerston North."

References

Palmerston North
Palmerston North